PDS 70 (V1032 Centauri) is a very young T Tauri star in the constellation Centaurus. The star has a protoplanetary disk containing two nascent exoplanets, named PDS 70b and PDS 70c, which have been directly imaged by the European Southern Observatory's Very Large Telescope. PDS 70b was the first confirmed protoplanet to be directly imaged.

Discovery and naming

The "PDS" in this star's name stands for Pico dos Dias Survey, a survey that looked for pre-main-sequence stars based on the star's infrared colors measured by the IRAS satellite.
PDS 70 was identified as a T Tauri variable star in 1992, from these infrared colors.  PDS 70's brightness varies quasi-periodically with an amplitude of a few hundredths of a magnitude in visible light. Measurements of the star's period in the astronomical literature are inconsistent, ranging from 3.007 days to 5.1 or 5.6 days.

Protoplanetary disk

The protoplanetary disk around PDS 70 was first hypothesized in 1992 and fully imaged in 2006 with phase-mask coronagraph on the VLT. In 2012 a large gap (~) in the disk was discovered, which was thought to be caused by planetary formation.

The gap was later found to have multiple regions: large dust grains were absent out to 80 au, while small dust grains were only absent out to the previously-observed . There is an asymmetry in the overall shape of the gap; these factors indicate that there are likely multiple planets affecting the shape of the gap and the dust distribution.

Planetary system

In results published in 2018, a planet in the disk, named PDS 70 b, was imaged with SPHERE planet imager at the Very Large Telescope (VLT). Modelling predicts that the planet has acquired its own accretion disk. The accretion disk was observationally confirmed in 2019, and accretion rate was measured to be at least 5*10−7 Jupiter masses per year. A 2021 study with newer methods and data suggested a lower accretion rate of 1.4*10−8 /year. It is not clear how to reconcile these results with each other and with existing planetary accretion models; future research in accretion mechanisms and Hα emissions production should offer clarity. The optically thick accretion disk radius is 3.0 , significantly larger than planet itself. Its bolometric temperature is 1193 K.

The emission spectrum of the planet PDS 70 b is gray and featureless, and no molecular species were detected by 2021.

A second planet, named PDS 70 c, was discovered in 2019 using the VLT's MUSE integral field spectrograph. PDS 70 c is in a near 1:2 orbital resonance with PDS 70 b, meaning that PDS 70 c completes nearly one revolution once every time PDS 70 b completes nearly two.

Circumplanetary disk
In July 2019 astronomers using the Atacama Large Millimeter Array (ALMA) reported the first-ever detection of a moon-forming circumplanetary disk. The disk was detected around PDS 70 c, with a potential disk observed around PDS 70 b. The disk was confirmed by Caltech-led researchers using the W. M. Keck Observatory in Mauna Kea, whose research was published in May 2020. An image of the circumplanetary disk around PDS 70 c was published in November 2021.

See also
 List of brightest stars
 List of nearest bright stars
 Lists of stars
 Historical brightest stars

References

External links
  (ESO; July 2021)

Centaurus (constellation)
Planetary systems with two confirmed planets
IRAS catalogue objects
K-type stars
Centauri, V1032
T Tauri stars
J14081015-4123525